Hemibagrus camthuyensis is a species of bagrid catfish found in Vietnam.

References

Nguyen, V.H., 2005. Cá nước ngọt Việt Nam. Tâp II. [Freshwater fishes of Vietnam]. Hà Nội: Nhà xuất bản nông nghiệp, 760 p.

Bagridae
Fish of Asia
Fish of Vietnam
Taxa named by Nguyễn Văn Hảo
Fish described in 2005